Melvin Tefft (20 November 1935 - 11 may 2003), was an American physician who specialised in radiation oncology in children at the Boston Children's Hospital and later at the Massachusetts General Hospital. He was the first to report an extraskeletal Ewing sarcoma in 1969.

Early life and education
Melvin Tefft was born on 20 November 1935 in Boston. In 1954 he received a bachelors degree from Harvard College, and in 1958 gained a medical diploma from Boston University School of Medicine.

Career
Tefft completed his internship at Boston City Hospital before taking up his residency in radiology at the Massachusetts General Hospital, where he also spent a year as a NIH fellow. Through the 1960s, at the Boston Children's Hospital, he progressed from assistant professor to chief of the division of radiology. He was influenced by Giulio D'Angio.

In 1970, he was at the Massachusetts General Hospital.

Selected publications

References

American physicians
People from Boston
1935 births
2003 deaths
Boston University School of Medicine alumni
Physicians of Massachusetts General Hospital
Harvard College alumni